The Amblycera are a large clade of chewing lice,
 parasitic on both birds and mammals. The Amblycera are considered the most primitive clade of lice.

Description 
These insects are very much like the familiar advanced sucking lice, except they do not stay on their host permanently. They roam freely over the surface of their host and, unlike other lice, do not form permanent attachments. They feed by chewing soft areas of skin, causing an area of localized bleeding from which they drink.

Species of this group have antennae but they cannot readily be seen because they lie in grooves in the side of the head.  Usually the antennae of Amblycera composes 4-5 segments.  The maxillary palps may, however, be present and these may be visible in mounted specimens but may be confused with the antennae.  Palps of amblycerans ranges in segments from two to five. The mandibles of Amblycera bite horizontally. The head is often broader and rounder anteriorly than of Anoplura but this morphologic difference is not reliable. The tarsi of species that parasitise birds have two claws, while of those that parasitise mammals have one only.

Families
The Amblycera are divided into the following families:
 Ancistronidae
 Boopidae Mjoberg, 1910
 Colpocephalidae Eichler, 1937
 Gliricolidae
 Gyropidae Kellogg, 1896
 Laemobothriidae Mjoberg, 1910
 Menoponidae Mjoberg, 1910
 Pseudomenoponidae Mjoberg, 1910
 Ricinidae Neumann, 1890
 Somaphantidae Eichler, 1941
 Trimenoponidae
 Trinotonidae Eichler, 1941

Significant species
Notable Amblycera that parasitise birds:
 Holomenopon leucoxanthum (Burmeister, 1838) – cause of "wet feathers" of ducks
 Menopon gallinae (Linnaeus, 1958) – the "shaft louse" of poultry, pale yellow in color
 Menopon phaeostomum (Nitzsch, 1818) – usually occurs on peafowl
 Menecanthus stramineus (Nitzsch, 1818) – the yellow "body louse" of poultry
 Trinoton anserinum (J.C.Fabricus, 1805) – may be found on ducks and swans

Notable species that parasitise mammals:
 Gliricola porcelli (Linnaeus, 1758) – on guinea-pigs
 Gyropus ovalis (Nitzsch, 1818) – on guinea-pigs
 Heterodoxus longitarsus (Piaget, 1880) – on Macropodidae (wallabies and kangaroos)
 Heterodoxus macropus (Le Souef & Bullen, 1902) – on Macropodidae
 Heterodoxus spiniger (Enderlein, 1909) – common on dogs in warm countries (between latitudes 40° north and 40° south)
 Trimenopon hispidium (Burmeister, 1838) – on guinea-pigs

References 

Lice
Unranked clades